Eric Ashby, Baron Ashby, FRS (24 August 1904 – 22 October 1992) was a British botanist and educator.

Born in Leytonstone in Essex, he was educated at the City of London School and the Royal College of Science, where he graduated with a Bachelor of Science. He was then demonstrator at the Imperial College from 1926 to 1929. In 1929, he received a Harkness Fellowship to the University of Chicago. Ashby was a lecturer at Imperial College from 1931 to 1935, and at the University of Bristol from 1935 to 1938.

Marriage
Ashby married Elizabeth Helen Margaret Farries, whom he met while they were working together on incineration techniques for measuring carbon in tissue. They had two children, Michael and Peter.

Career
In 1938, Ashby became professor of botany at the University of Sydney, a post he held until 1946. Between 1944 and 1945, he was Scientific Counsellor to Moscow. From 1947 to 1950, he held the Harrison Chair of  Botany at the University of Manchester. According to Burges and Eden"His enthusiasm and flair for botany made Manchester one of the leading botanical schools in the United Kingdom".

From 1950 to 1959 he was president and vice-chancellor of Queen's University, Belfast. For the University of Cambridge, he was Master of Clare College, Cambridge from 1959 to 1975, and vice-chancellor from 1967 to 1969. From 1968 to 1974 he was Chairman of the Governors at Culford School; and between 1970 and 1973, he was chair of the Royal Commission on Environmental Pollution. Ashby was knighted in 1956, and was created a life peer as Baron Ashby, of Brandon in the County of Suffolk on 6 July 1973.

Ashby was secretary of the Society for Experimental Biology from 1935 to 1938 and president of the British Association for the Advancement of Science from 1962 to 1963. He was elected a Foreign Honorary Member of the American Academy of Arts and Sciences in 1961.

In 1968, he received the Centenary Medal of the Royal Society of Tasmania and in 1973, he became president and chancellor of the Queen's University, Belfast. He was adviser to the British National Fruit Traders Association and a Fellow of the Royal Society (FRS). He was awarded an Honorary Degree (Doctor of Science) by the University of Bath in 1966.

See also

 List of Old Citizens

References

1904 births
1992 deaths
Academics of Imperial College London
Academics of the University of Bristol
Academics of Queen's University Belfast
Fellows of Clare College, Cambridge
Masters of Clare College, Cambridge
Vice-Chancellors of the University of Cambridge
Academics of the Victoria University of Manchester
Academic staff of the University of Sydney
Chancellors of Queen's University Belfast
Vice-Chancellors of Queen's University Belfast
Fellows of the Royal Society
Harkness Fellows
Knights Bachelor
Life peers
People educated at the City of London School
Honorary Fellows of the Royal Society of Edinburgh
Fellows of the American Academy of Arts and Sciences
Presidents of the British Science Association
Life peers created by Elizabeth II